Lindsay Davenport and Martina Hingis were the defending champions and defended their title, defeating Martina Navratilova and Jana Novotná in the final, 6–4, 6–4.

Draw

Final

Group A
Standings are determined by: 1. number of wins; 2. number of matches; 3. in three-players-ties, percentage of sets won, or of games won; 4. steering-committee decision.

Group B
Standings are determined by: 1. number of wins; 2. number of matches; 3. in three-players-ties, percentage of sets won, or of games won; 4. steering-committee decision.

References
Main Draw

Women's Legends Doubles